A wearable generator is an article of clothing that contains some form of electrical generation system built in. The concept encompasses a variety of generation systems intended to supply small amounts of power to keep portable electronics in a good state of charge through natural motions of the body.

Summary
There are many great projects related to wearable technology or wearable power generation. One concept, for example, is an article of clothing that has the ability to convert the movements of the wearer into electricity using nano-ion pumps. It is based on nanotechnology and has the ability to generate electricity for the purposes of building muscle mass and improving coordination. Emergency workers like firemen and paramedics could use chest-implanted sensors to create a floor plan of unfamiliar buildings; making a rookie perform his job as efficiently as a veteran. With cameras becoming cheaper and smaller, wearable generators may also serve as a quick method to recharge the batteries on those devices.  The environmental burden of disposing used batteries has contributed to e-waste; something that wearable generators may drastically reduce. Enough energy can theoretically be harnessed from a person's body heat to power a smartphone or tablet.

References

Concepts in alternative medicine
Hypothetical technology
Nanoelectronics